Bleiler is a surname. Notable persons with that surname include:

E. F. Bleiler (1920–2010), American editor, bibliographer, and scholar of science fiction, detective fiction and fantasy
Gretchen Bleiler (born 1981), American professional halfpipe snowboarder
Richard Bleiler (born 1959), American bibliographer in science fiction, fantasy, and horror, crime, and adventure fiction

See also
 
 Bleier
 Bleyer